Jozef Beständig (born 27 February 1978) is a Slovak former competitive pair skater. Competing with his sister Oľga Beständigová, he won nine senior international medals and eight Slovak national titles. They competed at the 2002 Winter Olympics, five World Championships, and seven European Championships, placing as high as 7th (2001 Europeans).

Personal life 
Born on 27 February 1978 in Bratislava, Czechoslovakia, Jozef Beständig is the elder brother of Oľga Beständigová. After retiring from skating, he became a financial counselor.

Skating career 
Beständig represented Slovakia with Beständigová. Their first ISU Championship was the 1997 Europeans in Paris; they finished last (17th). The following season, they placed 12th at the 1998 Europeans in Milan and 18th at the 1998 Worlds in Minneapolis.

Beständigová/Beständig achieved their highest ISU Championship result, 7th, at the 2001 Europeans in Bratislava. They would go on to qualify for the 2002 Winter Olympics in Salt Lake City, Utah, where they finished 17th.

Beständigová retired from competition following the 2001–02 season but returned to compete with her brother again for the 2004–05 season. The pair placed 8th at the 2005 European Championships in Turin and 15th at the 2005 World Championships in Moscow. They then ended their partnership.

Programs
(with Beständigová)

Results
GP: Champions Series/Grand Prix

(with Beständigová)

References

External links

 

Slovak male pair skaters
Olympic figure skaters of Slovakia
Figure skaters at the 2002 Winter Olympics
1978 births
Living people
Figure skaters from Bratislava